A non-renewable resource (also called a finite resource) is a natural resource that cannot be readily replaced by natural means at a pace quick enough to keep up with consumption. An example is carbon-based fossil fuels. The original organic matter, with the aid of heat and pressure, becomes a fuel such as oil or gas. Earth minerals and metal ores, fossil fuels (coal, petroleum, natural gas) and groundwater in certain aquifers are all considered non-renewable resources, though individual elements are always conserved (except in nuclear reactions, nuclear decay or atmospheric escape).

Conversely, resources such as timber (when harvested sustainably) and wind (used to power energy conversion systems) are considered renewable resources, largely because their localized replenishment can occur within time frames meaningful to humans as well.

Earth minerals and metal ores 

Earth minerals and metal ores are examples of non-renewable resources. The metals themselves are present in vast amounts in Earth's crust, and their extraction by humans only occurs where they are concentrated by natural geological processes (such as heat, pressure, organic activity, weathering and other processes) enough to become economically viable to extract. These processes generally take from tens of thousands to millions of years, through plate tectonics, tectonic subsidence and crustal recycling.

The localized deposits of metal ores near the surface which can be extracted economically by humans are non-renewable in human time-frames. There are certain rare earth minerals and elements that are more scarce and exhaustible than others. These are in high demand in manufacturing, particularly for the electronics industry.

Fossil fuels 

Natural resources such as coal, petroleum (crude oil) and natural gas take thousands of years to form naturally and cannot be replaced as fast as they are being consumed. Eventually it is considered that fossil-based resources will become too costly to harvest and humanity will need to shift its reliance to other sources of energy such as solar or wind power, see renewable energy.

An alternative hypothesis is that carbon based fuel is virtually inexhaustible in human terms, if one includes all sources of carbon-based energy such as methane hydrates on the sea floor, which are vastly greater than all other carbon based fossil fuel resources combined. These sources of carbon are also considered non-renewable, although their rate of formation/replenishment on the sea floor is not known. However their extraction at economically viable costs and rates has yet to be determined.

At present, the main energy source used by humans is non-renewable fossil fuels.  Since the dawn of internal combustion engine technologies in the 19th century, petroleum and other fossil fuels have remained in continual demand.  As a result, conventional infrastructure and transport systems, which are fitted to combustion engines, remain prominent throughout the globe.

The modern-day fossil fuel economy is widely criticized for its lack of renewability, as well as being a contributor to climate change.

Nuclear fuels 

In 1987, the World Commission on Environment and Development (WCED) classified fission reactors that produce more fissile nuclear fuel than they consume (i.e. breeder reactors) among conventional renewable energy sources, such as solar and falling water. The American Petroleum Institute likewise does not consider conventional nuclear fission as renewable, but rather that breeder reactor nuclear power fuel is considered renewable and sustainable, noting that radioactive waste from used spent fuel rods remains radioactive and so has to be very carefully stored for several hundred years. With the careful monitoring of radioactive waste products also being required upon the use of other renewable energy sources, such as geothermal energy.

The use of nuclear technology relying on fission requires Naturally occurring radioactive material as fuel. Uranium, the most common fission fuel, is present in the ground at relatively low concentrations and mined in 19 countries. This mined uranium is used to fuel energy-generating nuclear reactors with fissionable uranium-235 which generates heat that is ultimately used to power turbines to generate electricity.

As of 2013 only a few kilograms (picture available) of uranium have been extracted from the ocean in pilot programs and it is also believed that the uranium extracted on an industrial scale from the seawater would constantly be replenished from uranium leached from the ocean floor, maintaining the seawater concentration at a stable level. In 2014, with the advances made in the efficiency of seawater uranium extraction, a paper in the journal of Marine Science & Engineering suggests that with, light water reactors as its target, the process would be economically competitive if implemented on a large scale.

Nuclear power provides about 6% of the world's energy and 13–14% of the world's electricity. Nuclear energy production is associated with potentially dangerous radioactive contamination as it relies upon unstable elements.  In particular, nuclear power facilities produce about 200,000 metric tons of low and intermediate level waste (LILW) and 10,000 metric tons of high level waste (HLW) (including spent fuel designated as waste) each year worldwide.

Issues entirely separate from the question of the sustainability of nuclear fuel, relate to the use of nuclear fuel and the high-level radioactive waste the nuclear industry generates that if not properly contained, is highly hazardous to people and wildlife.   The United Nations (UNSCEAR) estimated in 2008 that average annual human radiation exposure includes 0.01 millisievert (mSv) from the legacy of past atmospheric nuclear testing plus the Chernobyl disaster and the nuclear fuel cycle, along with 2.0 mSv from natural radioisotopes and 0.4 mSv from cosmic rays; all exposures vary by location. Natural uranium in some inefficient reactor nuclear fuel cycles becomes part of the nuclear waste "once through" stream, and in a similar manner to the scenario were this uranium remained naturally in the ground, this uranium emits various forms of radiation in a decay chain that has a half-life of about 4.5 billion years, the storage of this unused uranium and the accompanying fission reaction products have raised public concerns about risks of leaks and containment, however the knowledge gained from studying the natural nuclear fission reactor in Oklo Gabon, has informed geologists on the proven processes that kept the waste from this 2 billion year old natural nuclear reactor that operated for hundreds of thousands of years.

Land surface 
Land surface can be considered both renewable and non-renewable resource depending on the scope of comparison. Land can be reused but new land cannot be created on demand so from economic perspective it's a fixed resource with perfectly inelastic supply.

Renewable resources 

Natural resources, known as renewable resources, are replaced by natural processes and forces persistent in the natural environment. There are intermittent and reoccurring renewables, and recyclable materials, which are utilized during a cycle across a certain amount of time, and can be harnessed for any number of cycles.

The production of goods and services by manufacturing products in economic systems creates many types of waste during production and after the consumer has made use of it. The material is then either incinerated, buried in a landfill or recycled for reuse.  Recycling turns materials of value that would otherwise become waste into valuable resources again.

In the natural environment water, forests, plants and animals are all renewable resources, as long as they are adequately monitored, protected and conserved. Sustainable agriculture is the cultivation of plant and animal materials in a manner that preserves plant and animal ecosystems and that can improve soil health and soil fertility over the long term. The overfishing of the oceans is one example of where an industry practice or method can threaten an ecosystem, endanger species and possibly even determine whether or not a fishery is sustainable for use by humans. An unregulated industry practice or method can lead to a complete resource depletion.

The renewable energy from the sun, wind, wave, biomass and geothermal energies are based on renewable resources. Renewable resources such as the movement of water (hydropower, tidal power and wave power), wind and radiant energy from geothermal heat (used for geothermal power) and solar energy (used for solar power) are practically infinite and cannot be depleted, unlike their non-renewable counterparts, which are likely to run out if not used sparingly.

The potential wave energy on coastlines can provide 1/5 of world demand. Hydroelectric power can supply 1/3 of our total energy global needs. Geothermal energy can provide 1.5 more times the energy we need. There is enough wind to power the planet 30 times over, wind power could power all of humanity's needs alone. Solar currently supplies only 0.1% of our world energy needs, but there is enough out there to power humanity's needs 4,000 times over, the entire global projected energy demand by 2050.

Renewable energy and energy efficiency are no longer niche sectors that are promoted only by governments and environmentalists. The increasing levels of investment and that more of the capital is from conventional financial actors, both suggest that sustainable energy has become mainstream and the future of energy production, as non-renewable resources decline. This is reinforced by climate change concerns, nuclear dangers and accumulating radioactive waste, high oil prices, peak oil and increasing government support for renewable energy. These factors are commercializing renewable energy, enlarging the market and growing demand, the adoption of new products to replace obsolete technology and the conversion of existing infrastructure to a renewable standard.

Economic models
In economics, a non-renewable resource is defined as goods, where greater consumption today implies less consumption tomorrow. David Ricardo in his early works analysed the pricing of exhaustible resources, where he argued that the price of a mineral resource should increase over time. He argued that the spot price is always determined by the mine with the highest cost of extraction, and mine owners with lower extraction costs benefit from a differential rent. The first model is defined by Hotelling's rule, which is a 1931 economic model of non-renewable resource management by Harold Hotelling. It shows that efficient exploitation of a nonrenewable and nonaugmentable resource would, under otherwise stable conditions, lead to a depletion of the resource. The rule states that this would lead to a net price or "Hotelling rent" for it that rose annually at a rate equal to the rate of interest, reflecting the increasing scarcity of the resources. The Hartwick's rule provides an important result about the sustainability of welfare in an economy that uses non-renewable source.

See also

 Clean technology
 Energy conservation
 Eurosolar
 Fossil fuel
 Fossil water
 Green design
 Hartwick's rule
 Hermann Scheer
 Hotelling's rule
 Hubbert's peak
 Liebig's law of the minimum
 Natural resource management
 Overfishing
 Peak oil
 Reserves-to-production ratio
 Sustainability

References

                                                                                                                                                                   

Natural resources
 
Environmental conservation
Space

it:Energie non rinnovabili